Phosphatidylinositol transfer protein beta isoform is a protein that in humans is encoded by the PITPNB gene.

The protein encoded by this gene is found in the cytoplasm, where it catalyzes the transfer of phosphatidylinositol and phosphatidylcholine between membranes.

References

Further reading